"That's Gangsta" is the first single from the Bun B album II Trill. It features Sean Kingston and is produced by J.R. Rotem. The single peaked at #45 on the U.S. Billboard Hot R&B/Hip-Hop Songs chart. The video is released on MTV2's Unleashed on April 21, 2008. The video features cameos from Young Buck, Middle Fingaz, P$C, J Prince, LeBron James, Chamillionaire and Slim Thug. There were also UGK Records artists Young T.O.E., XVII, B-Do and Big Bubb. Sean Kingston didn't appear in the music video.

Chart positions

2008 singles
Bun B songs
Sean Kingston songs
Song recordings produced by J. R. Rotem
Songs written by Sean Kingston
Songs written by Bun B
2008 songs